Devina Hermawan, born , is an Indonesian chef, author, and cooking instructor.

Education 

 Elementary School Santo Yusup I Bandung, Indonesia 2000–2006
 Junior High School Santo Aloysius Bandung, Indonesia 2006–2009
 Senior High School Santo Aloysius Bandung, Indonesia 2009–2012
 Bachelor of Business Management at Bandung Institute of Technology, Indonesia 2012–2016

Early life 
Cooking was an early passion for Hermawan. With her mother's encouragement, she explored international cuisine, taste and style of cooking.

Purely by autodidactism through cookbooks and YouTube in the culinary field, Devina opted for Business Management during her study in Bandung Institute of Technology, Indonesia.

As a personal chef, she presented her dishes to several of Indonesia's leading figures that include Susilo Bambang Yudhoyono, the sixth president of Indonesia, and Ridwan Kamil.
Prior to her days of being a mother, Devina was a runway model for designers.

Career 
Devina became widely known since she joined the television show MasterChef Indonesia Season 5. After MasterChef, Devina actively shares recipe videos and cooking tutorials on her YouTube channel, which is known for its "tips & tricks" and anti-fail methods. Within two years, the number of recipe videos that have been shared has reached 380 videos, with 2 million followers (as of 1 December 2021).

Cookbook 
Devina has published two cookbooks, namely "Indonesian Fusion Foods" (2019) and "Yummy! 76 Menu Favorit Anak" (2021). The book "Indonesian Fusion Foods" has been reprinted ninth times, while the book "Yummy! 76 Menu Favorit Anak" has been reprinted twice. Both of Devina's cookbooks were published by Kawan Pustaka publisher from Agromedia Group (as of 1 December 2021).

Brand ambassador and TV commercial 
Since 2021, Devina has been appointed as Indonesia's brand ambassador for Tefal, a French cookware and utensil manufacturer from Groupe SEB. In the same year, Devina has also been appointed as Indonesia's brand ambassador for Quaker, a food conglomerate from the United States. In the same year, Devina has also been appointed as Indonesia's brand ambassador for Anchor, a brand of dairy products and is one of the key brands owned by the New Zealand based international exporter Fonterra Co-operative Group.

In 2022 Devina was appointed as a brand ambassador for Winn Gas, a national-scale kitchen equipment and gas equipment manufacturer from Indonesia.

Devina also appeared in a TV commercial as a brand ambassador from BOLA Deli flour from FKS Food, along with Sarwendah Tan, Putri Habibie, and Putri Miranti.

Television show 
On 12 March 2022, a national cooking program called "Dapur Devina" starts airing on Television of the Republic of Indonesia (TVRI), a public television network and the oldest television network in Indonesia. This program presents recipes from various regions in Indonesia.

Special collaboration menu 
In December 2020, Devina together with Wowteg! from Sour Sally Group launched a special collaboration menu, "Nasi Bungkus Kekinian." In August 2021, Devina together with Shihlin Taiwan Street Snacks launched a special collaboration menu, "Ayam Bumbu Rujak." In October 2021, Devina together with Steak Hotel by Holycow! launched a special collaboration menu, "Cafe de Paris Steak and Fries."

Books 
 Indonesian Fusion Foods (2019), 
Yummy; 76 Menu Favorit Anak (2021),

Brand Ambassadors 

 Tefal (2021-now)
 Quaker (2021-now)
 Anchor (2021-now)
BOLA Deli (2021-now)
Winn Gas (2022-now)

Filmography

Television show 

 Dapur Devina

Notes and references

Notes

References

External links 

 

Living people
1993 births
People from Bandung
Sundanese people
Bandung Institute of Technology
Bandung Institute of Technology alumni
Indonesian chefs
Indonesian female models
Indonesian people of Chinese descent
Women chefs
Cookbook writers

Indonesian writers